The Anti-Japanese Army for the Salvation of the Country was a volunteer army led by Li Hai-ching resisting the pacification of Manchukuo. It had about 10,000 guerrilla troops described as being equipped with light artillery and numerous machine guns. They operated in the south of Kirin—now Heilongjiang—province. Li established his headquarters at Fuyu and was in control of the territory around there and southward as far as Nungan.

See also 
Japanese invasion of Manchuria
Pacification of Manchukuo
Second Sino-Japanese War

References 
 Jowett, Phillip S., Rays of The Rising Sun, Armed Forces of Japan's Asian Allies 1931-45, Volume I: China & Manchuria, 2004. Helion & Co. Ltd., 26 Willow Rd., Solihull, West Midlands, England.
 Wisconsin Rapids Daily Tribune. March 29, 1932. via NewspaperArchive.
 "Earthly Paradise". Time. May 2, 1932.

Anti-Japanese Volunteer Armies
Disbanded armies